Tyler Evan Roberson (born November 27, 1994) is an American professional basketball player for Szedeák of the Hungarian top division. He played college basketball for the Syracuse Orange.

Early life and high school career
Roberson is the son of Carla and Edmon Roberson and has three brothers and one sister. Roberson was taught how to play basketball by his father and first started expressing interest in the game at age four. He played at Union High School for a season and joined the New Jersey RoadRunners of AAU competition. As a sophomore, Roberson transferred to Roselle Catholic. He averaged 17.5 points and 11.7 rebounds for a 25-5 state championship team his senior year. Roberson committed to Syracuse over offers from Villanova and Kansas.

College career
He was suspended at the start of his freshman season due to an eligibility issue and received limited minutes the rest of the year. Roberson averaged 8.3 points and 7.3 rebounds per game as a sophomore. Roberson scored 14 points and gathered 20 rebounds in a win over Duke on January 17, 2016. As a junior, Roberson started all 37 games on Syracuse's Final Four team in 2016. In the NCAA Tournament, he pulled down 18 rebounds in the first-round win over Dayton. Roberson scored nine points and pulled down 10 rebounds in the Orange's Sweet 16 victory against Gonzaga. He contributed 10 points and eight rebounds in the Midwest Region final versus Virginia. Roberson averaged 8.8 points and a team-leading 8.5 rebounds per game as a junior. He averaged 5.3 points and 4.9 rebounds in 20 minutes per game as a senior.

Professional career
Roberson was selected by the Agua Caliente Clippers with the 15th pick in the 2017 NBA G League Draft. He was the second former Syracuse player drafted after John Gillon was taken with the 10th pick by the Texas Legends. On March 15, 2018, Roberson had 10 points, 11 rebounds and four assists in a 108–104 loss at the South Bay Lakers. In his rookie season for the Clippers, he averaged 9.7 points and 6.7 rebounds per game.

On July 26, 2018, the AEK Athens of the Greek Basket League announced that they had signed Roberson. On January 9, 2019, Roberson parted ways with AEK.

On January 24, 2019, Roberson re-signed with the Agua Caliente Clippers. In 20 games (two starts) with the Clippers during the 2019–20 season, Roberson averaged 6.1 points and 4.4 rebounds while shooting 58.2 percent from the field. He was traded to the South Bay Lakers on February 27, 2020, in exchange for a third-round pick in the 2020 NBA G League draft.

In April 2021, Roberson signed with Tallinna Kalev/TLÜ of the Estonian League, making his debut in a game against TalTech Basketball.

On January 3, 2022, Roberson was acquired by the Delaware Blue Coats. He was waived on January 31. 

On February 14, 2022, Roberson signed with KK Viimsi, returning to Latvian-Estonian Basketball League.

Career statistics

Domestic leagues

Regular season

|-
| 2018–19
| style="text-align:left;"| A.E.K.
| align=center | GBL
| 11  || 13.5 || .500 || - || .556 || 4.6 || .2 || .3 || .3 || 6.5
|}

FIBA Champions League

|-
| style="text-align:left;" | 2018–19
| style="text-align:left;" | A.E.K.
| 8 || 11.9 || .514 || - || .455 || 2.9 || .4 || .5 || .6 || 5.1
|}

References

External links

 Syracuse Orange bio

1994 births
Living people
AEK B.C. players
Agua Caliente Clippers players
American expatriate basketball people in Estonia
American expatriate basketball people in France
American expatriate basketball people in Greece
American men's basketball players
Basketball players from New Jersey
Fos Provence Basket players
People from Union Township, Union County, New Jersey
Roselle Catholic High School alumni
Small forwards
South Bay Lakers players
Sportspeople from Union County, New Jersey
Syracuse Orange men's basketball players
United States men's national basketball team players